is a third-person shoot 'em up video game released by Sega for arcades in 1987. Players control a helicopter to destroy enemy vehicles. The game was released as a standard stand-up arcade cabinet with force feedback, as the joystick vibrates. A helicopter shaped sit-down model was released, replacing the force feedback with a cockpit seat that moves in tandem with the joystick. It is a motion simulator cabinet, like the previous Sega Super Scaler games Space Harrier (1985) and After Burner (1987). The game's plot and setting was inspired by the film Blue Thunder (1983).

Versions were released for the Master System, Amiga, Amstrad CPC, Atari ST, Commodore 64, MS-DOS, MSX, TurboGrafx-16, X68000, and ZX Spectrum. The Nintendo 3DS remake was released as a 3D Classic in Japan on August 20, 2014, in North America and Europe on May 14, 2015, and in Australia on July 2, 2015. The sequel, Super Thunder Blade, was released exclusively for the Sega Genesis.

Gameplay

The player controls a helicopter gunship using its chain gun and missiles to destroy enemy tanks, helicopters, and other vehicles and structures, to save the home country. Each level is in either a top-down or third-person perspective view. The boss levels are in the top-down view.

The player is given 2 "lives" as continues, used if they are killed in a level. Clearing a level allows you to return, bypassing the levels before it.

The 3D classic release allows joystick emulation and gyroscopic controls.

Development
The plot and setting were inspired by the 1983 film Blue Thunder, from which a digitized frame became the title screen.

Reception

In Japan, Game Machine listed Thunder Blade in its January 15, 1988, issue as the fourth most successful upright arcade unit of the month. It went on to become Japan's ninth highest-grossing dedicated arcade game of 1988.

The arcade game was well received by critics. Clare Edgeley of Computer and Video Games called it "a helicopter simulation with several innovative features". She said it was "a brilliant game" with "superb" graphics and gameplay. Your Sinclair stated that "Thunder Blade is probably the game which took most of your money in the arcades this summer, probably one of the most eagerly awaited coin-op conversions".

At the 1988–1989 Golden Joystick Awards, the Sega Master System version won Console Game of the Year. The ZX Spectrum version also received a Crash Smash award from Crash magazine.

Notes

References

External links 
 Thunder Blade at KLOV
 

1987 video games
Amiga games
Amstrad CPC games
Arcade video games
Atari ST games
Commodore 64 games
DOS games
Golden Joystick Award for Game of the Year winners
Helicopter video games
MSX games
Nintendo 3DS eShop games
Sega arcade games
Sega Games franchises
Master System games
Rail shooters
Scrolling shooters
Single-player video games
TurboGrafx-16 games
U.S. Gold games
Video games developed in Japan
Virtual Console games
X68000 games
ZX Spectrum games